Barras may refer to:

Places
 Barras, Cumbria, England
 Barras, Alpes-de-Haute-Provence, France
 Barras, Piauí, Brazil
 Duas Barras, Rio de Janeiro, Brazil
 Sete Barras, São Paulo, Brazil

Other uses
 Barras (surname)
 Barras (market), a street and indoor weekend market in Glasgow, Scotland
 Barras (people), the inhabitants of Ovifat, Waimes, Liège, Belgium
 Barras Futebol Club, a Brazilian football club
 Operation Barras, a British army hostage rescue in Sierra Leone

See also
 Baras (disambiguation)
 Barrass
 Banderas